In geometry, Descartes' theorem states that for every four kissing, or mutually tangent, circles, the radii of the circles satisfy a certain quadratic equation. By solving this equation, one can construct a fourth circle tangent to three given, mutually tangent circles. The theorem is named after René Descartes, who stated it in 1643.

History
Geometrical problems involving tangent circles have been pondered for millennia. In ancient Greece of the third century BC, Apollonius of Perga devoted an entire book to the topic, De tactionibus [On tangencies]. It has been lost, and is known only through mentions of it in other works.

René Descartes discussed the problem briefly in 1643, in a letter to Princess Elisabeth of the Palatinate. He came up with the equation describing the relation between the radii, or curvatures, of four pairwise tangent circles. This result became known as Descartes' theorem.

This result was rediscovered in 1826 by Jakob Steiner, in 1842 by Philip Beecroft, and in 1936 by Frederick Soddy. The kissing circles in this problem are sometimes known as Soddy circles and line connecting their centers as Soddy line perhaps because Soddy chose to publish his version of the theorem in the form of a poem, titled The Kiss Precise. Soddy also extended the theorem to spheres; Thorold Gosset extended the theorem to arbitrary dimensions.

Definition of curvature

Descartes' theorem is most easily stated in terms of the circles' curvatures. The larger a circle, the smaller is the magnitude of its curvature, and vice versa.

For an internally tangent circle like the large red circle, that circumscribes the other circles, the sign is negative. If a straight line is considered a degenerate circle with zero curvature (and thus infinite radius), Descartes' theorem also applies to a line and three circles that are all three mutually tangent.

To find the radius of a fourth circle tangent to three given kissing circles, the equation can be written

The  symbol indicates that in general there are two solutions to this equation, and two tangent circles (or degenerate straight lines) to any triple of tangent circles. Problem-specific criteria may favor one of these two solutions over the other in any given problem.

Special cases

If two circles are replaced by lines, the tangency between the two replaced circles becomes a parallelism between their two replacement lines. For all four curves to remain mutually tangent, the other two circles must be congruent.

It is not possible to replace three circles by lines, as it is not possible for three lines and one circle to be mutually tangent.
Descartes' theorem does not apply when all four circles are tangent to each other at the same point.

 

Euler showed that this is equivalent to the simultaneous triplet of Pythagorean triples,

 
 
 

and can be given a parametric solution.  When the minus sign of a curvature is chosen,

 

this can be solved as,

 

where

 

parametric solutions of which are well-known.

Complex Descartes theorem
To determine a circle completely, not only its radius (or curvature), but also its center must be known. The relevant equation is expressed most clearly if the coordinates  are interpreted as a complex number . The equation then looks similar to Descartes' theorem and is therefore called the complex Descartes theorem.

Given four circles with curvatures  and centers  (for ), the following equality holds in addition to :

Once  has been found using , one may proceed to calculate  by rewriting  to a form similar to :

Generalizations

The generalization to  dimensions is sometimes referred to as the Soddy–Gosset theorem, even though it was shown by R. Lachlan in 1886. For example, in 3-dimensional space, five spheres can be mutually tangent. The curvatures of the hyperspheres satisfy
 
with the case  corresponding to a flat hyperplane, in exact analogy to the 2-dimensional version of the theorem.

Although there is no 3-dimensional analogue of the complex numbers, the relationship between the positions of the centers can be re-expressed as a matrix equation, which also generalizes to  dimensions.

See also
 Ford circles
 Apollonian gasket
 Problem of Apollonius ("circle tangencies")
 Soddy's hexlet
 Tangent lines to circles
 Isoperimetric point

Notes

External links
 Interactive applet demonstrating four mutually tangent circles at cut-the-knot
 The Kiss Precise

Euclidean plane geometry
Theorems about circles
Analytic geometry
Circle packing